Mordellistena elicodomma is a beetle in the genus Mordellistena of the family Mordellidae. It was described in 1967 by Franciscolo.

References

elicodomma
Beetles described in 1967